Sibinia transversa is a species in the family Curculionidae ("snout and bark beetles"), in the suborder Polyphaga ("water, rove, scarab, long-horned, leaf and snout beetles").
It is found in North America (excluding the Mexican region).

References

Further reading
 Arnett, R. H. Jr., M. C. Thomas, P. E. Skelley and J. H. Frank. (eds.). (21 June 2002). American Beetles, Volume II: Polyphaga: Scarabaeoidea through Curculionoidea. CRC Press LLC, Boca Raton, Florida .
 
 Poole, Robert W., and Patricia Gentili, eds. (1996). "Coleoptera". Nomina Insecta Nearctica: A Check List of the Insects of North America, vol. 1: Coleoptera, Strepsiptera, 41-820.
 Richard E. White. (1983). Peterson Field Guides: Beetles. Houghton Mifflin Company.

Curculioninae
Beetles described in 1897